Riverlea Park is a northern suburb of Adelaide in South Australia. It was created by excluding part of the suburb of Buckland Park in February 2022.

The northern boundary of Riverlea Park is the Gawler River, and its eastern boundary is Port Wakefield Road.

Riverlea Park contains a large urban housing estate under development by Walker Corporation. The main entrance is controlled by a new set of traffic lights installed on Port Wakefield Road. At the time the suburb was created, 605 lots had been sold for housing. The remaining part of Buckland Park remains predominantly rural.

References

Suburbs of Adelaide